Seongju County (Seongju-gun) is a county in North Gyeongsang Province, South Korea. This largely agricultural area is located immediately west of the metropolitan city of Daegu. The capital of the county is the town of Seongju.

Lotte Skyhill Seongju Country Club was selected as the location for the deployment of Terminal High Altitude Area Defense (THAAD) system in July 2016.

Seongju County is famous for its production of oriental melons. Farms in the county comprise about 70% of total oriental melon production in the country.

Administrative divisions 

Seongju County is divided into 1 eup and 9 myeon.

Climate
Seongju has a humid continental climate (Köppen: Dwa), but can be considered a borderline humid subtropical climate (Köppen: Cwa) using the  isotherm.

Twin towns – sister cities
  Gwanak-gu, South Korea (2005)

References

External links
Official Local Government Website

 
Counties of North Gyeongsang Province